Firestarter is a 1/3 scale exhibition monster truck conceived and completed in 2008 by Firestarter Racing of Essex County, Ontario.

The vehicle, the body of which is based on the actual firefighting pumpers manufactured by Seagrave Fire Apparatus in the 1930s, possesses all the characteristics of a full-scale monster truck.  Specifications include a 3.0 V6 engine, rear steering, Knight Stalker nitrogen shocks, a dual chain drive and 35" Super Swamper tires.  Engineer Steve Combs of KS Enterprises, Inc. who initially developed the nitrogen charged shock, was instrumental as a consultant in the suspension setup.  Steve currently calibrates and makes shocks for such major monster trucks as Grave Digger.

Firestarter made its public debut on January 17, 2009, at Ford Field in Detroit, Michigan.  Driven for major motorsports promoter Feld Entertainment, Firestarter appeared at Monster Jam and was recorded for broadcast by Speed Channel.  In addition, Firestarter completed several summer dates driving for Chris Arel Motorsports and the Monster Spectacular in both 2009 and 2010, and is currently driving with Monster Jam with bookings running into 2012.

See also
 Monster truck
 List of monster trucks
 Mini monster truck

References

External links
Still Photo Of Firestarter At Ford Field In Detroit, MI
Video Of The Vehicle Performing At Monster Jam
Factory Demonstration Video
Still Photo Of Firestarter At The WFCU Centre In Windsor, Ontario
Video Of Firestarter Performing At The Monster Spectacular
Newspaper Article On Firestarter And Its Creator, Douglas Papak As It Appeared In The Windsor Star On May 14, 2009
Newspaper Article On Firestarter As It Appeared In The Sarnia Observer On June 11th, 2009
Video Of Firestarter Being Introduced At The SSEC (Sarnia Sports And Entertainment Centre) On June 19th, 2009
Video Of Firestarter Performing At The SSEC For Chris Arel Motorsports And The Monster Spectacular
Newspaper Article On Firestarter And Its Creator, Douglas Papak As It Appeared In The London Free Press On March 5th, 2010
Video Of Firestarter Performing For Monster Jam in London, Ontario, Canada
Magazine Article On Firestarter And Its Creator, Douglas Papak As It Appeared In Windsor Life Magazine On May 2nd, 2011

Monster trucks
One-off cars